This article concerns the period 19 BC – 10 BC.

Significant people
 Caesar Augustus, Roman Emperor (27 BC–AD 14)

References